Justin Q. Slaughter is an American politician and retired college basketball player. Slaughter has served as a Democratic member of the Illinois House of Representatives from the 27th district, which consists of portions of Chicago and neighboring communities.

As a legislator, Slaughter has advocated for criminal justice reform, and was a chief sponsor of the SAFE-T Act.

Early life and education 
Slaughter was raised in Washington Heights in Chicago's South Side. He attended the University of Chicago Laboratory Schools, a college preparatory school. Slaughter went on to attend the University of Chicago, where he played college basketball as a guard on the Maroons from 1998 to 2002. 

Slaughter graduated with a degree in political science in 2002 and would later receive a master's degree in public policy and administration from Northwestern University.

Career 
Prior to holding elected office, Slaughter served as director of programs at the Illinois Department of Juvenile Justice. He was also an aide to Kwame Raoul during his time in the state senate.

Illinois House of Representatives 
In January 2017, Slaughter was appointed to replace Monique D. Davis as representative from the 27th district. Slaughter's constituency covers the Chicago neighborhoods of Washington Heights, Auburn Gresham, Beverly, Chatham, Morgan Park, Roseland, and West Pullman. Additionally, the district covers parts of the cities of Alsip, Blue Island, Crestwood, Midlothian, Orland Park, Palos Heights, Robbins, and Worth.

Tenure 
In office, Slaughter has been a supporter of criminal justice reform reforms. In his first year in office, Slaughter sponsored ultimately successful legislation that provided inmates with "training to develop skills for computers, public speaking and general business."

Slaughter was one of the lead sponsors of the SAFE-T Act (Safety, Accountability, Fairness and Equity-Today Act), which became state law in 2021. The legislation creates new standards for decertifying police officers who engage in misconduct, and limits the use of cash bail for nonviolent offenders.

Committee membership 
As of July 3, 2022, Representative Slaughter is a member of the following Illinois House committees:

 Appropriations - Higher Education Committee (HAPI)
 (Chairman of) Criminal Administration and Enforcement Subcommittee (HJUC-CAES)
 (Chairman of) Firearms and Firearm Safety Subcommittee (HJUC-FIRE)
 International Trade & Commerce Committee (HITC)
 (Chairman of) Judiciary - Criminal Committee (HJUC)
 (Chairman of) Juvenile Justice and System-Involved Youth Subcommittee (HJUC-JJSI)
 Operations Subcommittee (HSGA-OEPR)
 Procurement Subcommittee (HSGA-PROC)
 Public Utilities Committee (HPUB)
 (Chairman of) Sentencing, Penalties and Criminal Procedure Subcommittee (HJUC-SPCP)
 (Chairman of) Sex Offenses and Sex Offender Registration Subcommittee (HJUC-SOSO)
 State Government Administration (HSGA)
 Water Subcommittee (HPUB-WATR)

Electoral history

Personal life 
Slaughter lives with his wife and children in Brainerd Park, Chicago.

References

External links
 Profile at Illinois General Assembly

21st-century American politicians
Year of birth missing (living people)
Place of birth missing (living people)
Democratic Party members of the Illinois House of Representatives
Living people